Dederick is a surname. Notable people with the surname include: 

Ella Dederick (born 1996), American soccer player
Hannah Dederick (born 2002), American Paralympic athlete 
Robert Dederick (1919-1983), South African poet
Zadoc Dederick, American inventor

See also
Dederick, Missouri, an unincorporated community in Vernon County, Missouri, US